Villa Elisa Refinery is an oil refinery located in Villa Elisa,  from Asunción close to the Paraguay River and is owned by the Paraguay national oil company Petróleos Paraguayos. The refinery is capable of processing  of crude oil per day (1,200 m3/day) and produces lubricants, diesel, kerosene, naphtha and LPG.

The refining complex also has 42 tanks used to retain crude oil and refined products with a total capacity of 320,000 m3 and four LPG tanks with a capacity of 2,000 m3 each. There is also an oil terminal located on the Paraguay River that has 27 jetties and a loading and unloading capacity of 10,000 m3 per day, and a barge terminal used for loading and unloading of LPG.

References

Oil refineries in Paraguay
Central Department